Hulk Hogan's Main Event is a professional wrestling fighting game starring Hulk Hogan created by American studio Panic Button and published by Majesco Entertainment for the Xbox 360. The game requires the Kinect peripheral.

Reception

Hulk Hogan's Main Event received "generally unfavorable reviews" according to the review aggregation website Metacritic. Dan Ryckert of Game Informer commented that "Kinect has a hard time recognizing many required motions, and it's nowhere near fun even when it's working perfectly." Dave Rudden of Official Xbox Magazine said that "the career mode is a bore, the cartoony visual style is ugly, and the voice implementation is super-sloppy." In 2013, GamesRadar+ ranked it as the 40th worst game ever made. The staff criticized its poor Kinect implementation and the dated use of Hulk Hogan.

References

External links
Official website

2011 video games
505 Games games
Majesco Entertainment games
Professional wrestling games
Kinect games
Video games developed in the United States
Xbox 360 games
Xbox 360-only games
Video games based on real people
Cultural depictions of Hulk Hogan